Shugborough Hall is a stately home near Great Haywood, Staffordshire, England.

The estate was owned by the Bishops of Lichfield until the dissolution of the monasteries, upon which it passed through several hands before being purchased in 1624 by William Anson, a local lawyer and ancestor of the Earls of Lichfield. The estate remained in the Anson family for three centuries. Following the death of the 4th Earl of Lichfield in 1960, the estate was allocated to the National Trust in lieu of death duties, and then immediately leased to Staffordshire County Council. Management of the estate was returned to the National Trust in 2016. It is open to the public and comprises the hall, museum, kitchen garden and a model farm.

History

The Shugborough estate was owned by the Bishops of Lichfield until the dissolution of the monasteries around 1540, and thereafter passed through several hands, until it was purchased in 1624 by William Anson (c.1580–1644), a lawyer, of Dunston, Staffordshire for £1,000. In 1693, William Anson's grandson, also called William (1656–1720), demolished the existing manor house and constructed a three-story building which still forms the central part of the hall.

William's elder son, Thomas Anson MP (1695-1773), would further extend the house in the 1740s, adding two pavilions flanking either side of the central block. It was Thomas's younger brother, however, who would fund these changes; Admiral George Anson, created Lord Anson in 1747 and First Lord of the Admiralty in 1751, amassed a great fortune during his naval career, and when he died without issue he left the majority to his elder brother. Thomas also died childless and the estate passed to his sister's son, George Adams, who adopted the surname Anson by royal licence.

In 1806, George's son Thomas (1767–1818) was created 1st Viscount Anson. His son, the 2nd viscount, would be created 1st Earl of Lichfield in the coronation honours of William IV. The Earl led an extravagant lifestyle and amassed several large debts, which, in 1842, forced him to sell the entire contents of the house in a two-week-long sale. While the 2nd earl did much to restore the house and contents to its former glory, by the time his son inherited the estate it was heavily mortgaged.

In 1831, Princess Alexandrina Victoria of Kent, the future Queen Victoria, then 13, visited Shugborough with her mother, the Duchess of Kent, as part of an extensive tour of the country. The young princess stayed with many local landowners at the time, including the Earl of Shrewsbury.

Passing from east to west through the southern part of the park is the Trent Valley Line, planned in 1845. The railway is carried under the landscaped grounds in the  Shugborough Tunnel and is thus largely invisible. The tunnel entrances, which are listed grade II, are notably ornamental, particularly the 1847 western entrance. The double-track line is part of the West Coast Main Line, running north-west between Colwich Junction and Stafford.

Late 20th century and today
Following the death of the 4th earl in 1960, an agreement was reached whereby the estate would pass to the National Trust in lieu of death duties. The deal was finalised and the house opened to the public in 1966. The estate was immediately leased to Staffordshire County Council, who managed and maintained it on behalf of the National Trust, with Lord Lichfield retaining an apartment in the hall until his death in 2005, paying a nominal rent to the new owners. His successor, the 6th Earl, decided to relinquish the lease of the apartments, thus severing the family's direct links with the estate.

In 2016 Staffordshire County Council handed the estate back to the National Trust, with 49 years remaining on its lease. The move is expect to save the council £35 million, with the Trust intending to renew investment in the property.

The grounds and mansion house are open to the public. The attraction is marketed as "The Complete Working Historic Estate", which includes a working model farm museum dating from 1805 complete with a working watermill, kitchens, a dairy, a tea room, and rare breeds of farm animals. Originally restored in 1990, the estate's brewery is England's only log-fired brewery that still produces beer commercially. Previously used only on special occasions, the brewhouse has been a working exhibit since 2007, operated by Titanic Brewery.

Since 2011 the private apartments have housed an exhibition of the work of Patrick Lichfield. His cameras and lighting gear have been set up in a recreation of his studio, and there is a gallery of some of his most famous photographic subjects.

Architecture

Interior

The state rooms
The state rooms at Shugborough Hall include The State Dining Room, The Red Drawing Room, The Library, The Saloon, The Verandah Room, The Anson Room and The State Bedroom. These contain some of the most opulent and highly decorated interiors in the hall.

The Verandah Room contains a 208-piece porcelain dinner service commissioned to commemorate Admiral Anson's circumnavigation of the globe in HMS Centurion. The dinner service was offered to Admiral Anson in gratitude for assisting in fighting the huge fires that were destroying the merchant district in Canton.  (Story narrated by Shugborough guide October 2015). The State Bedroom overlooks the terrace and was occupied by Queen Victoria during her childhood visit.

Private apartments
The private apartments were the living quarters of 5th Earl and his family until 2010. The Boudoir, with its silver gilt wallpaper, is the only room in the hall with hand-painted ceilings with gold detailing. Other rooms include The Lilac and Yellow Bedrooms, The Sitting Room and the completely circular Breakfast Room.

Exterior
In about 1693, William Anson (1656–1720) demolished the old house and created a new mansion. The entrance front, then facing to the west, comprised a balustraded, three-storey, seven-bayed central block. In about 1748 his great-grandson Thomas Anson (1767–1818) commissioned architect Thomas Wright to remodel the house, which was extended with flanking two-storey, three-bayed pavilions linked to the central block by pedimented passages.

At the turn of the 19th century, the house was further altered and extended by architect Samuel Wyatt. The pavilions and passages were incorporated into the main building, and a new porticoed entrance front with ten Ionic pillars was created at the east. These pillars resemble carved stone but are hollow timber structures. This was done for Thomas Anson, the 1st Viscount Anson and his wife Anne Margaret Coke, daughter of Thomas Coke, the 1st Earl of Leicester, whom he married in 1794. The hall, as it is seen today, is built in a neo-classical style and encased in slate, sanded to resemble stone.

The park and follies
Like many landowners of his time, Thomas Anson (1695–1773) took a keen interest in the landscaping of his parkland. The land around Shugborough was largely flat, which ensured that trees, follies and water would play an important role in shaping the landscape. The grounds contain a number of follies, many of which, such as The Chinese House and two Chinese-style bridges, have a Chinese theme, in honour of Admiral George Anson. Admiral Anson, who had visited Canton, left a considerable sum of money to his brother Thomas Anson when he died, which was used to develop the hall and estate. The Chinese House and the red iron footbridge are both grade I listed.

In 1760, Classical architect James Stuart was employed to design a number of monuments. Stuart had visited Athens in the early 1750s, and Ancient Greek influences are obvious at Shugborough. Staurt designed for Anson a copy of the Choragic Monument of Lysicrates and a grade I listed triumphal arch based on the Arch of Hadrian in Athens.

The Shepherd's Monument

The Shepherd's Monument is a stone and marble folly within the grounds of Shugborough hall, engraved with the inscriptions "O.U.O.S.V.A.V.V" and "D.M.". The monument has been internationally well-known since 1982, when the book The Holy Blood and the Holy Grail drew attention to the mysterious Shugborough inscription. Carved by Peter Scheemakers, theories have abounded, including some which suggest it may indicate the whereabouts of the Holy Grail.

See also
 Grade I listed buildings in Staffordshire
 Listed buildings in Colwich, Staffordshire

References and sources

References

Sources

External links

 Shugborough Estate - official site
 List of paintings on show

Agricultural museums in England
Anson family
Country houses in Staffordshire
Farm museums in England
Grade I listed parks and gardens in Staffordshire
Grade I listed buildings in Staffordshire
Grade I listed houses
Historic house museums in Staffordshire
Living museums in England
National Trust properties in Staffordshire
Open-air museums in England
Borough of Stafford
Cannock Chase